Vijat Mohindra (born 1985) is an Indian American fashion photographer who has worked with celebrities. He was born in Ohio and is based in Los Angeles.

Exhibitions and other works 

 Always Believe that something wonderful is about to happen (2016)
 Lepore

References

External links 

 

Fashion photographers
1985 births
Living people